Gurdon Saltonstall (27 March 1666 – 20 September 1724) was governor of the Colony of Connecticut from 1708 to 1724. Born into a distinguished family, Saltonstall became an accomplished and eminent Connecticut pastor.  A close associate of Governor Fitz-John Winthrop, Saltonstall was appointed the colony's governor after Winthrop's death in 1707, and then reelected to the office annually until his own death.

Early life and pastor
Saltonstall was the son of Nathaniel and Elizabeth (Ward) Saltonstall, a prominent north Massachusetts family active in Massachusetts politics since the 1630s. He received his bachelor's degree in 1684 from Harvard Divinity School, where he studied theology, and was awarded his master's degree in 1687. It was at this time that Saltonstall first preached at First Christ Church in New London where he impressed congregants enough to warrant his appointment as the town's sole pastor. Saltonstall soon grew close to the Connecticut's governor, Fitz-John Winthrop and became not simply an advisor in spiritual matters, but in civil ones as well. When Governor Winthrop's health failed him, Saltonstall eventually began assuming executive responsibilities in the Governor's absence. He was married to Mary Whittinghame (d. 1730), a granddaughter of Mayor of New York John Lawrence (1618–1699).

Political career
Upon Governor Winthrop's death in 1707, Saltonstall was appointed governor of the Colony of Connecticut by a special session of the legislature, a decision that sparked some outcry because of Saltonstall's status as clergy. Saltonstall himself was hesitant to leave his church and take on the position of governor, which prompted the state assembly to aid his First Church of Christ in finding a replacement pastor. His selection was approved by voters in May of that year, and Saltonstall continued to be re-elected annually until his death. Governor was just one of the influential positions held by Saltonstall, as he was appointed commander of the Connecticut militia and Chief Justice of its Superior Court.

Saltonstall believed strongly in the power of traditional authority, a trademark of his time as clergyman and governor. He was wholly intolerant of divergent Christian sects, and favored the enjoining of church and government into what he imagined would be a more effective system, an idea enumerated in the Saybrook Platform, a proposal mainly ascribed to him. The governor also found opposition to his government, or dispute within it to be contemptible, and frequently threatened to resign if such discord was not discontinued.

Saltonstall's support of established authority is also seen in his decision-making throughout Queen Anne's War, the second major intercolonial war over control of North America. The governor was a loyal supporter of the British cause, seeking to reduce colonial opposition to the war effort, and assisted it by increasing the recruitment and equipment of Connecticut militiamen sent to battle French forces. The Connecticut soldiers would eventually total 4,000 men, a sizable portion of the colony's 17,000 people. Because of the war's heavy costs, Connecticut's fiscal situation deteriorated, but Saltonstall's enthusiastic support for the Crown won the colony much improved relations with Great Britain.

The governor worked closely with Massachusetts Governor Joseph Dudley in peacefully resolving the problem of the "Equivalent Lands", just one of many border disputes demanding his attention.

In 1704, Saltonstall ruled against a mulatto slave seeking freedom: "According to the laws and constant practice of this Colony, and all other plantations (as well as the civil law) such persons as are born of negro bondwomen are themselves in like condition, that is born in servitude. Yet it saith expressly, that no man shall put away or make free his negro or mulatto slave, etc,. which undeniably shows and declares an approbation of such servitude, and that mulattos may be held as slaves within this government."

Personal life
His daughter, Katherine, married politician and soldier William Brattle, who was a classmate of Richard Saltonstall at Harvard University.

References

External links
 

1666 births
1724 deaths
Politicians from Haverhill, Massachusetts
Colonial governors of Connecticut
People of colonial Connecticut
Harvard Divinity School alumni